Paraactinoptera danielsi is a species of tephritid or fruit flies in the genus Paraactinoptera of the family Tephritidae.

Distribution
Australia.

References

Tephritinae
Insects described in 2003
Diptera of Australasia